Tungi Spirit is the name given to a distilled product made in Saint Helena from the fruit of the prickly or cactus pear (Opuntia ficus-indica).

Terminology 
Tungi is the local Saint Helenian name for the prickly or cactus pear.

Usage 
Three principal varieties of tungi grow on Saint Helena, but only two are used in the production of Tungi spirit. These are both examples of the largest fruit grown: the "English" (or yellow) fruit and the "Madeira" (or large red) fruit. These are cultivars of Opuntia ficus indica. The small "spiny red" tungi fruits (O. elatior) are not normally used for distillation, despite remaining in season for almost eight months of the year. By comparison with the large varieties, their juice content is low.

External links

 St Helena Tungi Distillery website

Distilled drinks
Economy of Saint Helena
Saint Helenian culture
Saint Helenian cuisine